This is a list of Philippine congressional committees (standing committees and special committees) that are currently operating in the Senate of the Philippines, the upper house of the Philippine Congress.

The composition of Senate committees is outlined in Rule X of the Rules of the Senate.



Standing committees 
There are 41 standing committees in the Philippine Senate for the 19th Congress as of September 28, 2022.

According to the Rules of the Senate, the President Pro Tempore, the Majority Floor Leader, and the Minority Floor Leader are ex officio members of all standing committees.

a Composed of 3 senior vice chairpersons and 10 vice chairpersons. One ex-officio member (Legarda) is among the senior vice chairpersons; she is not included in the count for total members.b The bloc member is either a chairperson or vice chairperson.

Congressional oversight and ad hoc committees 
There are 9 congressional oversight, ad hoc, and special committees in the 19th Congress as of November 21, 2022.

a First created in the 10th Congress, then reconstituted in subsequent congresses.b First created in the 17th Congress, then reconstituted in subsequent congresses.c Composed of Senate members only.

See also
List of Philippine House of Representatives committees
Philippine Senate

References

External links
Senate of the Philippines website

 
Senate of the Philippines committees
Senate of the Philippines